Cove Fort may refer to:

Cove Fort, Millard County, Utah, - a 19th-century defensive fortification in the Western United States
Cove Fort, County Cork, Ireland - an 18th-century fort and land battery in Cork Harbour, Ireland